The Turkish Regional Amateur League is the fifth tier of the Turkish football league system. The tier comprises a number (usually 11-13, varies by season) of groups across Turkey, each consisting of teams grouped according to the regions in which they are based. Every season, 9 teams are promoted to the TFF Third League while the bottom two teams of each group are relegated to the Super Amateur Leagues of their respective provinces.

League status 
Turkish Regional Amateur League contains 149 teams which participate in eleven groups. 1 of these groups contains 12 teams, 3 of these groups contain 13 teams and the remaining 7 groups contain 14 teams.
At the end of the season 9 teams will be promoted to TFF Third League. These teams will be determined by a play-off which will be played between 26 teams who finish groups in top two. In the first round 11 second placed teams will be reduced to 7. 11 first placed team and 7 teams from first round will participate in the second round of the play-off. At these stage, If there are teams from the same region or group, they will be paired with each other. After this round the remaining 9 teams will be promoted. The 22 teams which finish in the bottom two of their groups will be relegated to the Super Amateur Leagues.

2016–17 season

Groups

2015–16 season
The teams promoted to TFF Third League: 

12 Bingölspor
Elaziz Belediyespor
Erbaaspor

Türk Metal Kırıkkalespor
Afjet Afyonspor
Halide Edip Adıvarspor

Kütahyaspor
Muğlaspor
Kocaelispor

Groups

2014–15 season
The teams promoted to TFF Third League: 

Cizrespor
Yomraspor
Dersimspor
Kozan Belediyespor

Kastamonuspor 1966
Zara Belediyespor
Bodrum Belediye Bodrumspor
Manisa Büyükşehir Belediyespor

Sultanbeyli Belediyespor
Düzcespor
Tekirdağspor

Groups

2013–14 season
The teams promoted to TFF Third League: 

Halide Edip Adıvarspor
Erzin Belediyespor
Çine Madranspor

Tirespor 1922
Çatalcaspor
Niğde Belediyespor

Bayburt Grup Özel İdarespor
Etimesgut Belediyespor
Zonguldak Kömürspor

Groups

2012–13 season
The teams promoted to TFF Third League:

1930 Bafraspor
68 Yeni Aksarayspor
Ankara Adliyespor
Ayvalıkgücü Belediyespor

Balçova Belediyespor
Çıksalınspor
Düzyurtspor
Kızılcabölükspor

Payas Belediyespor 1975
Tuzlaspor
Yeni Diyarbakırspor

Groups

2011–12 season
The teams promoted to TFF Third League:

Bergama Belediyespor
Silivrispor
Derince Belediyespor

Fatih Karagümrük
Isparta Emrespor
Kahramanmaraş BBSK

Kayseri Şekerspor
Çorum Bld.
Erzincan Refahiyespor

Groups

2010–11 season
The teams promoted to TFF Third League:

Erzurum BBSK
Erganispor
Beşikdüzüspor
Çarşambaspor

Elazığ Belediyespor
Manavgat Evrensekispor
Kilimli Belediyespor
Aydınspor 1923

Yeni Sandıklı Bld.
Maltepespor
Ümraniyespor
Küçükçekmece SK

Groups

See also
Süper Lig
TFF First League
TFF Second League
TFF Third League
Amatör Futbol Ligleri
Turkish Cup (since 1962-63)

References

External links

Federation website
Regional Amateur League format explained

5
Fifth level football leagues in Europe